Altamash Sayed is an Indian professional footballer who plays as a midfielder for Mohammedan SC in the I-League.

Career
Sayed began his career in the youth ranks of Mumbai. He soon joined the Pune F.C. Academy and played with the club in the youth I-League. He also represented Pune in the Bordoloi Trophy, the Durand Cup, and captained the under-19 side in the IFA Shield.

Minerva Punjab
In December 2016, after Minerva Punjab were confirmed to be part of the I-League, Sayed was announced to be part of their team. He made his professional debut for the side on 17 January 2017 against Mohun Bagan. He started but only played 37 minutes as Mohun Bagan emerged as 4–0 winners.

Real Kashmir
On 31 July 2019, he pursued a deal with Real Kashmir he will play in the I-League

Career statistics

References

Living people
Indian footballers
Mumbai FC players
Pune FC players
RoundGlass Punjab FC players
Association football midfielders
I-League players
1996 births
Footballers from Mumbai
Bengaluru FC players
Real Kashmir FC players
Indian Super League players